Ziervogel is a German language surname. Notable people with the name include:

 Benjamin Ziervogel (1983), Austrian violinist
 Jeremias Ziervogel (1802–1883), founding member of the Cape Parliament
 Meike Ziervogel (1967), German novelist and publisher

References 

German-language surnames
German toponymic surnames
Surnames from nicknames